Elm Grove may refer to:

United States
 Elm Grove (town), Kansas
 Elm Grove, Kentucky, a community
 Elm Grove, Louisiana, a community
 Elm Grove, Missouri, an early starting point of the Oregon Trail
 Elm Grove, Oklahoma, a census-designated place
 Elm Grove, Texas (disambiguation), the name of several populated places in this state
 Elm Grove (Courtland, Virginia), a historic plantation
 Elm Grove, West Virginia, a neighborhood of Wheeling
 Elm Grove (Southside, West Virginia), a historic site
 Elm Grove, Wisconsin, a village

Elsewhere
 Elm Grove, Brighton, an area of the city of Brighton and Hove, England

See also
 Elm Grove Township (disambiguation)